Matfield Township is a township in Chase County, Kansas, United States.  As of the 2000 census, its population was 155.

Geography
The streams of Bull Creek, Camp Creek, Corn Creek, Crocker Creek, Jack Creek, Little Cedar Creek, Mercer Creek, Shaw Creek, Steak Bake Creek and Thurman Creek run through this township.

Communities
The township contains the following settlements:
 City of Matfield Green.
 Ghost town of Thurman.

Cemeteries
The township contains the following cemeteries:
 High Prairie.
 Matfield Green.

Further reading

References

External links
 Chase County Website
 City-Data.com
 Chase County Maps: Current, Historic, KDOT

Townships in Chase County, Kansas
Townships in Kansas